Kevin Cotter (born May 28, 1974) is an American lightweight rower. He won a gold medal at the 1999 World Rowing Championships in St. Catharines with the lightweight men's eight.

References

1974 births
Living people
American male rowers
World Rowing Championships medalists for the United States